Jason Chambers (born March 23, 1980, in Chicago, Illinois) is an American actor, mixed martial artist and sports commentator. Chambers is best known for his role as the host of the popular weekly television program Human Weapon on The History Channel. He has appeared in multiple television programs including CSI, Days of Our Lives, As the World Turns and The Middleman.  Chambers was featured on Extra as one of "America's Most Eligible" bachelors. Chambers is actively involved with  City of Hope National Medical Center, a Cancer Research institute which he was recently appointed to the Board of Directors.

Early life
Jason Chambers, of Greek, French and Irish descent, was born on March 23, 1980 in Chicago, Illinois, to Dale Chambers, a homemaker, and George West, who worked for Roadway Services. Chambers resided in Tinley Park, Illinois until the age of 12, then moved to Chicago where he resided until he was 16. At 21, Chambers moved to New York City to study acting. In 2006 he moved to Los Angeles, California. Chambers resides in Miami, Florida.

Career

Commentary
Chambers provided color commentary alongside Jon Anik for Bellator Fighting Championships English broadcast in their inaugural season on ESPN. He was then signed by ONE Championship as their lead color commentator. Jason was called "The Best Color Commentator, Not in the UFC" by Cage Potato

Although Chambers has previously sat in the color commentator seat for MMA events, he was also hired directly by The Ultimate Fighting Championship to handle Play-by-play duties for alongside Dominick Cruz and Michael Bisping for the FIGHT PASS Stream of Shooto brazil.

Acting
Chambers began studying acting in 2000 at Act One Studios in Chicago and later improv at The Second City Training Center.

In 2003, he moved to New York to continue his studies. There he appeared in television series Guiding Light, All My Children, Can You Tell? and As the World Turns. In 2006 he moved to Los Angeles where he has been cast as Spencer on Days of Our Lives and the street racing badboy Mercury on CSI: NY.  In 2008 he was cast in the recurring role of Anvil in The Middleman on ABC Family, but he appeared in only one episode before the show was canceled after its first season.

Hosting
Chambers was the host of the hit series Human Weapon on The History Channel with co-host Bill Duff from July 20, 2007, to August 28, 2008.  Chambers has also been a host for NBC's YourLaTv, a show featuring things to do and see in and around Los Angeles.
He is a regular co-host/contributor for the "MMA Chokehold" segment of Attack of the Show! where he, Blair Butler and Kevin Pereira discuss upcoming MMA events.

Podcasting 
The Jason Chambers Podcast (TJCP) was launched on Youtube, Spotify and iTunes September 1, 2021.  It has been, tongue in cheek, hailed as "...the next best thing to the Joe Rogan Experience" .  Twice a week Jason chats with interesting guest from all walks of life, including Award Winning Author Ben Mezrich, MMA Hall of Famer Matt Serra, BJJ Standout Garry Tonon and Cryptocurrency experts like Charlie Shrem and comedians Bryan Callen  and Russel Peters.

TJCP is one of Spotify's fastest growing News & Entertainment Podcast in the USA .

Other media
In 2010 he began writing for FIGHT! Magazine. He was also featured as a contestant on the television show "Fear Factor" in 2004.

Martial arts
Chambers is a Jeet Kune Do concepts instructor and has a brown belt in 10th Planet Jiu-Jitsu under Eddie Bravo and a black belt under Renzo Gracie. During his time in Israel he learned Krav Maga.

Mixed martial arts record

|-
| Win
| align=center| 18–5–2
| Dan New
| Submission (rear naked choke)
| TFC: Power Fights
| 
| align=center| 1
| align=center| 2:11
| Hammond, Indiana, United States
| 
|-
| Win
| align=center| 17–5–2
| Rene Gonzalez
| Decision (split)
| Mainstream MMA: Cold War
| 
| align=center| N/A
| 
| Iowa, United States
| 
|-
| Loss
| align=center| 16–5–2
| Tristan Yunker
| Submission (armbar)
| TFC 7: Total Fight Challenge 7
| 
| align=center| 1
| align=center| 1:29
| Hammond, Indiana
| 
|-
| Loss
| align=center| 16–4–2
| Jimmy Smith
| Submission (heel hook)
| PF 1: The Beginning
| 
| align=center| 1
| align=center| 1:55
| Hollywood, California, United States
| 
|-
| Loss
| align=center| 16–3–2
| Michihiro Omigawa
| Decision (split)
| Icon Sport: Lawler vs. Niko 2
| 
| align=center| 3
| align=center| 5:00
| Honolulu, Hawaii, United States
| 
|-
| Draw
| align=center| 16–2–2
| Kosuke Umeda
| Draw
| Deep: 22 Impact
| 
| align=center| 2
| align=center| 5:00
| Tokyo, Japan
| 
|-
| Win
| align=center| 16–2–1
| Billy Stamp
| Submission (twister)
| TFC 4: Total Fight Challenge 4
| 
| align=center| 1
| align=center| 2:18
| Hammond, Indiana
| 
|-
| Loss
| align=center| 15–2–1
| Thiago Alves
| Submission (verbal)
| IHC 8: Ethereal
| 
| align=center| 1
| align=center| 4:57
| Hammond, Indiana
| 
|-
| Win
| align=center| 15–1–1
| Emmett Olvera
| Submission (armbar)
| RM 6: Lord of the Ring
| 
| align=center| 1
| align=center| 0:37
| Tijuana, Mexico
| 
|-
| Win
| align=center| 14–1–1
| Adrian Serrano
| Submission (guillotine choke)
| TMAC 2: Total Martial Arts Challenge 2
| 
| align=center| 1
| align=center| 0:27
| Hammond, Indiana
| 
|-
| Win
| align=center| 13–1–1
| Mark Long
| TKO (punches)
| TFC 1: Total Fight Challenge 1
| 
| align=center| 1
| align=center| 0:52
| Hammond, Indiana
| 
|-
| Win
| align=center| 12–1–1
| Josh Kruger
| Submission (armbar)
| TMAC: Total Martial Arts Challenge
| 
| align=center| 1
| align=center| 1:11
| Cicero, Illinois, United States
| 
|-
| Win
| align=center| 11–1–1
| Erick Snyder
| Submission (guillotine choke)
| MFC: Maximum Fighting Challenge
| 
| align=center| 1
| align=center| 1:53
| Hammond, Indiana
| 
|-
| Win
| align=center| 10–1–1
| Justin Hynes
| Submission (guillotine choke)
| TCC: Total Combat Challenge
| 
| align=center| N/A
| 
| Hammond, Indiana
| 
|-
| Win
| align=center| 9–1–1
| Jack Jones
| Submission (strikes)
| TC: Total Combat 2
| 
| align=center| 1
| 
| Chicago, Illinois, United States
| 
|-
| Win
| align=center| 8–1–1
| Corey Talbert
| Submission (armbar)
| TCC: Total Combat Challenge
| 
| align=center| 1
| align=center| 1:44
| Chicago, Illinois
| 
|-
| Loss
| align=center| 7–1–1
| Dan Spychalski
| Submission (ankle lock)
| MAC: Midwest Absolute Challenge
| 
| align=center| 1
| align=center| 7:20
| McHenry, Illinois, United States
| 
|-
| Win
| align=center| 7–0–1
| Efrain Saladar
| TKO
| IE: Independent Event
| 
| align=center| 2
| align=center| 2:12
| 
| 
|-
| Win
| align=center| 6–0–1
| Mike Court
| Decision
| XC: Xtreme Challenge
| 
| align=center| N/A
| 
| 
| 
|-
| Draw
| align=center| 5–0–1
| Bill Peach
| Draw
| CC 6: Chicago Challenge 6
| 
| align=center| N/A
| align=center| 0:00
| Chicago, Illinois
| 
|-
| Win
| align=center| 5–0
| Ken Davis
| TKO (strikes)
| JKD: Challenge 4
| 
| align=center| N/A
| 
| 
| 
|-
| Win
| align=center| 4–0
| Alex Evan
| Submission (rear naked choke)
| RBP: Fight Night
| 
| align=center| 1
| 
| Chicago, Illinois
| 
|-
| Win
| align=center| 3–0
| Tony Velasquez
| TKO
| RBP: Fight Night
| 
| align=center| 1
| 
| Chicago, Illinois
| 
|-
| Win
| align=center| 2–0
| Nicolas Smith
| Decision (unanimous)
| RBP: Fight Night
| 
| align=center| N/A
| 
| Chicago, Illinois
| 
|-
| Win
| align=center| 1–0
| Jose Gomez
| TKO (injury)
| RBP: Fight Night
| 
| align=center| 1
| 
| Chicago, Illinois
|

References

External links
Official Website

American male mixed martial artists
Mixed martial artists from Illinois
Welterweight mixed martial artists
1980 births
Living people
American Jeet Kune Do practitioners
American Wing Chun practitioners
American sanshou practitioners
American savateurs
American sambo practitioners
American practitioners of Brazilian jiu-jitsu
People awarded a black belt in Brazilian jiu-jitsu
Male actors from Chicago
Mixed martial arts broadcasters
Mixed martial artists utilizing boxing
Mixed martial artists utilizing Jeet Kune Do
Mixed martial artists utilizing Krav Maga
Mixed martial artists utilizing sambo
Mixed martial artists utilizing sanshou
Mixed martial artists utilizing savate
Mixed martial artists utilizing Wing Chun
Mixed martial artists utilizing wrestling
Mixed martial artists utilizing MCMAP
Mixed martial artists utilizing Brazilian jiu-jitsu
Sportspeople from Chicago